José Reyes Rodríguez Rodríguez (born 5 January 1962) is a Spanish sprint canoer who competed in the late 1980s. At the 1988 Summer Olympics in Seoul, he was eliminated in the semifinals of the K-1 1000 m event.

References

External links
 

1962 births
Canoeists at the 1988 Summer Olympics
Living people
Olympic canoeists of Spain
Spanish male canoeists
20th-century Spanish people